North East Fife is a county constituency in Fife, Scotland, represented in the House of Commons of the UK Parliament by Wendy Chamberlain of the Liberal Democrats since the 2019 general election.

The seat was created in 1983, and was held by the Conservative Party for four years, before being represented by Menzies Campbell from 1987 to 2015. Campbell was elected as a member of the Liberal Party, which later merged with the Social Democratic Party to form the Liberal Democrats. At the 2015 general election, the seat was gained by Stephen Gethins of the Scottish National Party (SNP). Gethins held his seat at the 2017 general election by just two votes over Elizabeth Riches of the Liberal Democrats, making the seat the most marginal in the United Kingdom. In the 2019 general election, Chamberlain defeated Gethins to regain the seat for the Liberal Democrats; this was the SNP's only loss of the election.

Boundaries 

1983–2005: North East Fife District.

2005–present: The area of the Fife Council other than those parts in the constituencies of Dunfermline and West Fife, Glenrothes, and Kirkcaldy and Cowdenbeath.

North East Fife constituency is in the region of Fife in Scotland. Fife has the River Tay on its northern coast, and the Firth of Forth to the south. The famous golf and university town of St Andrews is the major settlement in the seat. Others include Cupar, Newport-on-Tay, Newburgh, Auchtermuchty, and Anstruther.

Members of Parliament

Election results

Elections in the 2010s

North East Fife was notable in several respects in the 2019 general election: it was the SNP's only loss of the election, had the largest decrease in vote share for the Conservative Party (after the special case of Chorley, where the party did not stand) and also had the smallest Labour share of the vote in the United Kingdom, at 3.7% (again excluding Chorley, where the party did not stand). The seat went from the most marginal seat at the 2017 general election to the fortieth most marginal in 2019 (measured by percentage majority). When measured by absolute majority, North East Fife was the second most marginal Lib Dem-held seat at the election (after Caithness, Sutherland and Easter Ross).

North East Fife was the most marginal result in the country at the 2017 general election, with incumbent SNP MP Stephen Gethins seeing his majority cut from 4,344 votes (9.6%) to 2 votes (0.004%) ahead of the Liberal Democrat candidate, Elizabeth Riches. An alike result in Winchester at the 1997 general election was adjudicated and declared void and resulted in a legislative change in party naming rules (the Registration of Political Parties Act 1998).

Elections in the 2000s
In 2005 the ward of Leven East was incorporated into this constituency from what was Central Fife.

Elections in the 1990s

Elections in the 1980s

 Preceded by East Fife

See also 
 East Fife Constituency

References

Works cited

Westminster Parliamentary constituencies in Scotland
Constituencies of the Parliament of the United Kingdom established in 1983
Politics of Fife